Tourist Trap is a 1979 American supernatural slasher film directed by David Schmoeller and starring Chuck Connors,  Jocelyn Jones, Jon Van Ness, Robin Sherwood, and Tanya Roberts. The film follows a group of young people who stumble upon a roadside museum run by a lonely eccentric, where an unknown killer with psychokinetic powers begins to murder them. Schmoeller co-wrote the script with J. Larry Carroll who served as producer for the film alongside famous producer/director Charles Band.

Plot 
Eileen and her boyfriend Woody are driving through the California desert. When their car gets a flat tire, Woody goes to find a gas station. Their friends Becky, Jerry, and Molly are traveling in a different vehicle. They reach Eileen and all drive off to collect Woody.

Woody has found a gas station but it appears deserted. He enters the back room but becomes trapped by an unseen force. Various mannequins appear and cackle as objects fly off shelves at him until a metal pipe impales and kills him.

The others find Slausen's Lost Oasis, a tourist trap, but their vehicle mysteriously breaks down. Jerry tries to fix the car and the girls go skinny dipping. Mr. Slausen—the owner of the tourist trap—appears, holding a shotgun. He seems embittered by the decline of his tourist trap since the construction of a new freeway. The girls apologize for trespassing.

Slausen offers to help Jerry with the car, but insists the group go to his home with him to get his tools. There, they see the tourist trap: animated waxwork figures. Eileen is curious about a nearby house, but Slausen insists that the women should stay inside the museum. Slausen takes Jerry to fix their car. Eileen leaves to find a phone in the other house. There, she finds mannequins and a stranger wearing a grotesque mask appears behind her. Various items in the room move of their own accord and the scarf Eileen is wearing strangles her to death.

Slausen returns, saying that Jerry drove into town. When told that Eileen left, he goes to the house and finds Eileen has been turned into a mannequin. He returns and tells Molly and Becky he did not find Eileen. Frustrated, the women leave to search for her themselves. Becky enters the house and finds a mannequin resembling Eileen. She is attacked by the masked killer and multiple mannequins. She later wakes up tied in the basement with Jerry. Jerry says the killer is Slausen's brother Davey. Also held captive is Tina, another traveler, who is strapped to a table. She is killed by the masked man. Jerry frees himself and attacks the killer, but is overpowered.

Molly is pursued by the masked man. She meets Slausen, who drives her to the museum and gives her a gun while he goes inside. The masked man appears and Molly shoots, but the gun is loaded with blanks. The man removes the mask, revealing himself to be Slausen. Molly is soon captured and restrained to a bed.

Becky and Jerry escape from the basement but get separated. Slausen takes Becky back to the museum. There, she is killed by an Indian chief figure who throws a knife at her, stabbing her in the back of the head. Back at the house, Jerry arrives to rescue Molly, but he has unknowingly turned into a mannequin. Slausen dances with the figure of his wife, and Molly sees that the wife has become animated. Traumatized, she kills Slausen with an axe.

The next morning, a now-insane Molly drives away with the mannequin versions of her friends.

Cast

Production

Conception 
The screenplay for Tourist Trap was written by David Schmoeller and J. Larry Carroll, the latter of whom pitched the film to producer Charles Band. Initially, Schmoeller intended for John Carpenter to direct the film, but Carroll was unsatisfied with the financial arrangements, and opted instead that Schmoeller should direct. Carroll and Schmoeller had previously pitched the film to producers Samuel Z. Arkoff and Bruce Cohn Curtis, but were unable to secure a production arrangement.

The original screenplay did not feature the telekinetic powers; according to Carroll, the idea was proposed by Band, who insisted it be implemented into the script. Schmoeller drew inspiration from the surrealist films of Alejandro Jodorowsky and Luis Buñuel, as well as his observations of store mannequins in a JCPenney department store.

Casting 
The production did not appoint a casting director for the film, instead relying on independent talent agents to help cast the roles. Schmoeller said that $50,000 of the film's budget was dedicated to salary for the lead actor portraying the villain, Mr. Slausen. The role was offered to several older Hollywood actors, such as Jack Palance and Gig Young, but both turned the project down. Chuck Connors, who was the production crew's third choice for the role, accepted the role.

According to Schmoeller, each of the actors in the film aside from Connors auditioned for their parts. Jocelyn Jones was cast as the female lead, Molly, after Schmoeller had seen some of her previous performances, while Tanya Roberts was given the role of Becky. Jon Van Ness and Robin Sherwood were given the roles of Jerry and Eileen, respectively.

An unidentified actor named Shailar Coby is credited as Davey, Mr. Slausen's homicidal brother in the film. It's revealed later in the second act that Davey and Mr. Slausen are the same person, and that he has dissociative identity disorder. This plot element was inspired by Psycho (1960). Chuck Connors plays both personalities, the name Shailar Coby was made from the first and middle names of Schmoeller's son, Shailar and Coby. The actor Shailar Coby does not exist. This fake credit was created to hide the fact from the audience that Davey and Mr. Slausen are the same person, as having Chuck Connors credited for both parts would have been suspicious, and the reveal is meant to be a plot twist.

Filming 
Tourist Trap was filmed in 24 days in Los Angeles County, California, with additional interiors shot at Rampart Sound Studios in Los Angeles. Principal photography began on March 27, 1978. A portion of the interior scenes were shot at an abandoned house located at 5255 Hollywood Boulevard which was scheduled for demolition. Schmoeller made arrangements with the contractor to postpone the demolition of the building for five days, during which time the crew shot footage. By using the abandoned location, the production saved an estimated $30,000 in set construction and soundstage fees. David Wyler, the son of William Wyler, served as second assistant director, while the director of photography was Nicholas von Sternberg, son of director Josef von Sternberg.

Production designer Robert A. Burns, who had worked on Tobe Hooper's The Texas Chain Saw Massacre (1974) and Wes Craven's The Hills Have Eyes (1977), handled the art direction—and the majority of the special effects—on Tourist Trap, including the mannequins and their physical manipulations. To accomplish the poltergeist-like effects in the film's opening scene, the set was constructed at a rotated 90 degrees; this allowed items to be hurled by the crew from the cabinet—which was, in fact, anchored to the ceiling—to the floor, which appeared on camera as a wall. Other special effects were accomplished with the use of wires. For the death sequence of Tanya Roberts's character, for example, a block of wood was taped behind Roberts's hair; a knife attached to a wire was hurled at the back of her head, which stuck into the wooden block.

Schmoeller recalled the filming process as being a "learning" experience as he was a first-time director, stating in a 2014 interview that he learned a significant amount of "how to work with actors" from actress Jones.

Music 
Italian composer Pino Donaggio was in town working on Joe Dante's Piranha (1978) at the time that David Schmoeller was filming Tourist Trap. Since Donaggio spoke Spanish – as did Schmoeller – the director was able to convince the composer to score the music for Tourist Trap. The two would have subsequent collaborations, including Crawlspace (1986).

Release 
The film premiered in Los Angeles on March 14, 1979. Despite its depictions of violence and macabre images, the Motion Picture Association of America awarded the film a PG rating. Because of its rating, the film was able to receive significant broadcasting on syndicated television in the years following its theatrical release.

Critical reception 

From contemporary reviews, Variety wrote: "Although pic has some appropriately menacing music and occasionally employs some decent special effects, the plot is too loaded with cliches, from the concept to individual bits of dialog to be taken seriously and not silly enough to be regarded as delightfully bad". Charles Champlin of the Los Angeles Times wrote that the film "has some moments of effectiveness, but even the hard-line shiverists are likely to feel it's a long time between shrieks". Tim Pulleine of the Monthly Film Bulletin called the film a "wholly unimaginative exercise in low-budget horror plunders Psycho for its central plot gimmick in a fashion even more hamfisted than it is bare-faced. Nothing much is made of the potentially sinister import of the wax dummies, by comparison with whom the human performers also fail to come off too well". Ginger Varney of LA Weekly wrote that the film's screenplay "falls short of perfection," but praised the art direction by Robert A. Burns, commenting that it "mounts sufficient thrills to please even the picky hard-core shock fan."

From retrospective reviews, author and film critic Leonard Maltin gave the film one and a half out of four stars, stating that although the film had a couple of genuine scares, it was a "mostly boring thriller".
Author Stephen King, in his book Danse Macabre (1981), praised the film as an obscure classic, noting that the film "wields an eerie spooky power, as wax figures begin to move and come to life in a ruined, out-of-the-way tourist resort".

Jason Buchanan from AllMovie praised the film, calling it "one of the most underappreciated low-budget horror films of the 1970's". In his review on the film, Buchanan commended the film's atmosphere, score, Conners' performance, and unsettling use of sound and imagery, comparing it to Tobe Hooper's The Texas Chain Saw Massacre. TV Guide awarded the film two out of four stars, calling it a "bizarre, eerie shocker".

Home media 
The film was released on VHS and DVD by Cult Video on July 20, 1998. It was re-released on DVD by Wizard Entertainment on March 19, 2013. Full Moon Features released the film for the first time on Blu-ray on May 20, 2014. The Full Moon Blu-ray release features a truncated version of the film that runs at 85 minutes; though the film's violent scenes remain intact, minor plot points are absent from this cut of the film. The full uncut version of the film on Blu-ray was finally released by Full Moon on November 24, 2020. This version restored the missing 5 minutes and is featured in a collectible retro VHS packaging, with additional supplements including a Mr. Slausen action figure and a DVD copy. A standard single-disc Blu-ray was released on February 9, 2021.

Notes

References

Sources

External links 
 
 
 
 

1979 films
1979 horror films
1979 independent films
1970s slasher films
American independent films
American slasher films
Films about dissociative identity disorder
Films directed by David Schmoeller
Films scored by Pino Donaggio
Films set in deserts
Films set in museums
Films shot in Los Angeles
Mannequins in films
Native Americans in popular culture
1970s psychological horror films
Films with screenplays by David Schmoeller
Films about telekinesis
Supernatural slasher films
1970s supernatural horror films
1979 directorial debut films
American exploitation films
1970s English-language films
1970s American films